Misanthropos is the first full-length album by the American experimental metal band Paria.  It was co-released by Black Market Activities and Imagine It Records on November 2, 2004.

Track listing

Reception

References

2004 debut albums
Black Market Activities albums
Paria (band) albums